(October 15, 1916 – December 30, 1989) was a Japanese swimmer who competed at the 1932 Summer Olympics in Los Angeles.

Miyazaki was born in Kosai, Shizuoka Prefecture, Japan. He was selected for the Japanese Olympic team for the 1932 Los Angeles Olympics at the age of 15, and was one of the youngest members. In the semi-finals of the 100 m freestyle event, he surpassed the Olympic record previously set by American champion Johnny Weissmuller with a time of 58.2 seconds, and won the gold medal. The following day, as part of the team competing in the 4 × 200 m freestyle relay event, he won a second gold medal, with the team setting a new world record of 8 minutes 58.4 seconds. After his return to Japan, he entered Keio University and retired from competitive sports.

See also
 List of members of the International Swimming Hall of Fame

References
Killanin, Michael Morris. The Olympic games, 1984: Los Angeles and Sarajevo. John Rodda (1983) 
Lohn, John. Historical Dictionary of Competitive Swimming. Scarecrow Press, (2010).

External links
Profile at DatabaseOlympics

1916 births
1989 deaths
Sportspeople from Shizuoka Prefecture
Keio University alumni
Olympic swimmers of Japan
Swimmers at the 1932 Summer Olympics
Olympic gold medalists for Japan
World record setters in swimming
Medalists at the 1932 Summer Olympics
Japanese male freestyle swimmers
Olympic gold medalists in swimming
20th-century Japanese people